is a Japanese-South Korean model who is affiliated with Oscar Promotion.

Youn-A uses this as a stage name, while her name in Korean was Kim Yeonga (김영아). She was an exclusive model in the women's magazine Oggi and appeared in many television advertisements.

Ryoko Yonekura calls Youn-a my younger sister (imoto 妹) and best friend.  They were in the same modelling agency.

Filmography

TV series

References

External links
 Youn-a's official blog 
 Youn-a's official Instagram 

Japanese female models
1985 births
Living people
People from Seoul
Japanese people of South Korean descent